Banksia arborea, commonly known as Yilgarn dryandra, is a species of tree that is endemic to Western Australia. It has serrated, sharply pointed leaves, and yellow flowers and is found inland north of Southern Cross.

Description
The flower spikes are borne on the ends of branches and are composed of between 110 and 180 individual flowers.

Taxonomy and naming
Yilgarn dryandra was first formally described in 1964 by Charles Gardner who gave it the name Dryandra arborea in the Journal of the Royal Society of Western Australia from specimens he collected on hills near Koolyanobbing. In 2007, Austin Mast and Kevin Thiele changed the name to Banksia arborea. The specific epithet (arborea) is a Latin word meaning "tree-like".

Distribution and habitat
Banksia arborea grows between ironstone rocks in open shrubland on hills north of Southern Cross.

Conservation status
This banksia is classified as "Priority Four" by the Government of Western Australia Department of Parks and Wildlife, meaning that is rare or near threatened.

Ecology
An assessment of the potential impact of climate change on this species found that its range is likely to contract by between 50% and 80% by 2080, depending on the severity of the change.

References

arborea
Endemic flora of Western Australia
Eudicots of Western Australia
Plants described in 1964
Taxa named by Charles Gardner